A urethrectomy is a surgical procedure to remove all or part of the male urethra, a tube that connects the urinary bladder to the genitals for the removal of fluids out of the body.

See also
 Urethrotomy
 List of surgeries by type

References

Surgical oncology
Surgical removal procedures
Male genital surgery